Agim Krajka (1 May 1937 – 1 March 2021) was an Albanian composer. He was known as one of the greatest masters of music at that time.

Biography 
He was born on 1 May 1937, in the small city of Kavajë, Albania to a family from Dibër, present day North Macedonia. Krajka began his musical career at the Pioneer Palace in Tirana sometime in the early 1950s where he learned accordion, the musical instrument for which he was to become famous. He went on to study composition at the State Conservatory in Tirana between 1963-1968.
Known for his close collaboration with singer Vaçe Zela, he authored two of her most well-known songs, Lemza and Djaloshi dhe Shiu. He also composed music for several films such as "Zonja nga Qyteti", "Udha e Shkronjave".. etc.
He was awarded Albania's Merited People's Artist prize for his long contribution to music. He received the "Honor of the Nation" Decoration.

Krajka died on 1 March 2021, aged 83.

References

External links
 
 

Merited Artists of Albania
Albanian composers
1937 births
2021 deaths
People from Kavajë
Male composers
20th-century composers
20th-century Albanian musicians
20th-century male musicians
21st-century composers
21st-century Albanian musicians
21st-century male musicians